Abu Abdallah V (ruled 1504–1517) was a Sultan of the Kingdom of Tlemcen in Algeria. He was a son of Abu Abdallah IV. In the beginning of his reign the Oran Fatwa were made during his reign he defeated spain in the battle of Mers-el-Kebir (1507) and lost Oran in 1509, he also according some doubtful sources had to be vassal of Aragon in 1512 which will be ended by the failed expedition to Tlemcen by Spain and indefinitively ended by the ruler Abu Zayyan IV and his struggle against Spain in Tlemcen and his brother allied to them in June 1543 by the support of Iznassen tribe.

References

Year of birth missing
1517 deaths
Berber rulers
Zayyanid dynasty
16th-century Berber people
16th-century monarchs in Africa